Goncharovka is a rural locality (a selo) in Shelestovskoye Rural Settlement, Oktyabrsky District, Volgograd Oblast, Russia. The population was 246 as of 2010. There are 5 streets.

Geography 
Goncharovka is located on the Aksay Yesaulovsky River, 42 km northeast of Oktyabrsky (the district's administrative centre) by road. Shelestovo is the nearest rural locality.

References 

Rural localities in Oktyabrsky District, Volgograd Oblast